Marimac Recordings was founded by Larry MacBride in 1984 and continued with releases of American old time, blues and Cajun music until his death from abdominal cancer on August 24, 1993.

The releases covered old master fiddlers, young string bands, and under-represented Cajun and blues musicians. The label released some 100 recordings before Larry MacBride's death. In 1996, Rounder Records issued a sampler CD of recordings from the label.

Roster
Brad Leftwich
Cephas & Wiggins
Rafe Stefanini with the Wildcats
Matokie Slaughter
Tracy Schwarz
Volo Bogtrotters

Discography
A partial listing of the recordings issued is available on-line which omits a number of albums including

 6020 Cajun Dance Tonight – The Bone Tones
 6021 Louisiana and You – Tracy Schwarz

References

Folk record labels
Record labels established in 1984
Record labels disestablished in 1993
American independent record labels
Blues record labels